Promised Land is a 2002 film based on the 1978 English translation of the award-winning Afrikaans novel, Na die Geliefde Land (1972) by the South African author, Karel Schoeman.

The film was directed by Jason Xenopoulos and starred Nick Boraine; other cast included Lida Botha, Wilma Stõckenstrom, Louis van Niekerk, Tobie Cronje, Grant Swanby, Daniel Browde, Ian Roberts, Dan Robbertse and Yvonne van den Bergh. It was made on a budget of just over R15 (~2US$).

It won the Best Screenplay Award at the Tokyo International Film Festival in 2002.

External links 
 
  Review of Promised Land.

2002 films
English-language South African films
2002 drama films
South African drama films
2000s English-language films